The third season of The Fairly OddParents premiered on November 8, 2002 and ended on November 21, 2003. The season was produced by Frederator Studios and Nickelodeon Animation Studio.

Episodes

(HH) indicates the amount of households an episode was viewed in when it premiered.

DVD releases

References

2003 American television seasons
The Fairly OddParents seasons